2005 in Ghana details events of note that happened in Ghana in the year 2005.

Incumbents
 President: John Kufuor
 Vice President: Aliu Mahama
 Chief Justice: George Kingsley Acquah

Events

January
7th - President Kufuor as president of Ghana, for the second time after the 2004 elections.

 
9th- Hearts of oak defeats their arch rivals kotoko in Kumasi to win the maiden confederation cup. The defeat led to enormous pain in the kotoko fraternity.

February

March
6 March - 48th independence anniversary

April

May

June

July

August

September

October

November

December

National holidays
Holidays in italics are "special days", while those in regular type are "regular holidays".
 January 1: New Year's Day
 March 6: Independence Day
 May 1: Labor Day
 December 25: Christmas
 December 26: Boxing Day

In addition, several other places observe local holidays, such as the foundation of their town. These are also "special days."

References